The 2018 Valencian Community motorcycle Grand Prix was the nineteenth and final round of the 2018 MotoGP season. It was held at the Circuit Ricardo Tormo in Valencia on 18 November 2018.

In the Moto3 race, Red Bull KTM Ajo wildcard Can Öncü made history by winning on his debut, becoming the youngest ever Grand Prix winner at the age of 15 years, 115 days.

In the MotoGP class, no Yamaha or Honda rider finished on the podium for the first time since the 2007 San Marino Grand Prix.

In the Moto2 class, this was the final race for the Honda CBR600RR inline-4 engine package and also the final race for the Tech 3 Mistral 610 and Suter MMX2 chassis packages that débuted at the 2010 Qatar Grand Prix, since a new 765cc (46.7 cu in) inline-3 engine supplied by Triumph Motorcycles was introduced and Tech 3 and Forward Racing switched manufacturers to KTM and MV Agusta respectively in 2019.

Classification

MotoGP
The race, scheduled to be run for 27 laps, was red-flagged after 13 full laps, as heavy rain had caused multiple riders to crash and racing conditions were deemed too dangerous. For the restart, the race distance was 14 laps.

 Xavier Siméon was declared unfit to start the race following two crashes in practice.

Moto2

Moto3

Championship standings after the race
Bold text indicates the World Champions.

MotoGP

Moto2

Moto3

Notes

References

Valencia
Valencian Community motorcycle Grand Prix
Valencian Community motorcycle Grand Prix
21st century in Valencia
Valencian Community motorcycle Grand Prix